Blood money, also called bloodwit, is money or some sort of compensation paid by an offender (usually a murderer) or their family group to the family or kin group of the victim.

Particular examples and uses
Blood money is, colloquially, the reward for bringing a criminal to justice. A common meaning in other contexts is the money-penalty paid by a murderer to the kinsfolk of the victim. These fines completely protect the offender (or the kinsfolk thereof) from the vengeance of the injured family. The system was common among Germanic peoples as part of the Ancient Germanic law before the introduction of Christianity (weregild), and a scale of payments, graduated according to the heinousness of the crime, was fixed by laws, which further settled who could exact the blood-money, and who were entitled to share it. Homicide was not the only crime thus expiable: blood-money could be exacted for most crimes of violence. Some acts, such as killing someone in a church or while asleep, or within the precincts of the royal palace, and corporal infamy (rape) were "bot-less"; the death penalty was inflicted instead. Such a criminal was outlawed, and could be killed on sight or thrown into a bog in case of rape according to Tacitus.

In Islam

In Islamic terms, Qisas can in some cases result in blood money being paid out to the family of victims. The amount varies from country to country and from case to case.

In Judaism
As a person's life is considered as being the property of God, Judaism forbids the taking of blood-money for the life of a murdered victim.

In Japan
In Japanese culture it is common to give blood money, or mimaikin, to a victim's family.  Such was the case with Lucie Blackman's father, who accepted £450,000 as blood money for the murder of his daughter.

In Korea
Under the Korean legal system, it is common for those accused of both minor (such as defamation) and serious crimes to offer blood money (hapuigeum, 합의금) to the victim, and if accepted then the perpetrator is usually excused from further punishment. Despite being common practice, its use in high-profile cases does sometimes result in protests.

Other meanings or uses

In Christianity
In the Christian Bible, the term is used to refer to the thirty pieces of silver Judas Iscariot received in exchange for revealing the identity of Jesus Christ to the forces sent by the Pharisees and/or the Sanhedrin. After the crucifixion of Christ, Judas returned the payment to the chief priests, who "took the silver pieces and said, 'It is not lawful to put them into the treasury, because it is the price of blood.'"

In shipping 
"Shanghaiing" was the practice of the forced conscription of sailors. Boarding masters, whose job it was to find crews for ships, were paid "by the body," and thus had a strong incentive to place as many seamen on ships as possible. This pay was called blood money.

See also

 Anglo-Saxon law
 Blood feud
 Blood law
 Blood libel
 Danegeld
 Diyya
 Ericfine
 Feud
 Galanas
 Germanic law
 Główszczyzna
 Kanun
 Leges inter Brettos et Scottos
 Leibzoll 
 Religious minority
 Protection money
 Tallage
 Weregild
 Wrongful death

References

Criminal law
Criminal procedure
Judicial remedies
Restorative justice
Punishments